Psychodrama (stylised in uppercase letters) is the debut studio album by British rapper Dave, released on 8 March 2019. It follows his first two EPs, Six Paths (2016) and Game Over (2017). The album features guest appearances from J Hus, Burna Boy and Ruelle. Psychodrama was executive produced by both Dave and Fraser T. Smith. The album features Dave's piano playing, while Smith assisted with Baroque influences, including strings, brass, harps, as well as more contemporary music through the use of drums and the synthesizer.

A concept album, Psychodrama follows the narrative of a therapy session, primarily detailing the impact of Dave's elder brothers' prison convictions, along with his struggles with mental health, strained relationships, and the tough social conditions that confront poor black youths. The album was supported by four singles: "Black", "Streatham", "Location" and "Disaster", with the latter three all reaching the top 10 on the UK Singles Chart.

Psychodrama debuted at number one on the UK Albums Chart and received widespread acclaim from critics, being hailed by some as one of the best albums of the year. It became the most-streamed first-week British rap album in the UK with a total of 23.6 million streams. The album was certified Platinum by the British Phonographic Industry (BPI) for sales of at least 300,000 copies in the UK. It won the 2019 Mercury Prize and Album of the Year at the 2020 Brit Awards.

Background 
In a 2017 interview with NME, Dave revealed he was working on his debut album slated for a 2018 release, stating: "I know exactly how I’m going to make it and what I need it to be, I just need to find the time."

Speaking on his relationship with Dave, co-executive producer Fraser T. Smith said, "I’ve known Dave since he was 17. I was in the middle of working on Stormzy’s Gang Signs and Prayer album and my friends Jack Foster and Benny Scarrs who manage Dave introduced us. We immediately hit it off and put in a studio session. We wrote "Picture Me" during that session and the relationship developed into us working together on Dave’s first and second EPs 6 Paths, and Game Over."

The album was officially announced on 21 February 2019 following the release of his single "Black'" to YouTube. An accompanying tour was announced days later, and the tracklist was revealed on 3 March, showing features from Burna Boy, Ruelle, and the then-incarcerated J Hus. Coinciding with the album's release, Dave released another single, "Streatham" on 7 March, via a music video.

Production 
Regarding the recording process for Psychodrama, Smith said, "I never want to repeat myself creatively, and was wary about replicating the unique processes and dynamics which had made my working relationships with Kano and Stormzy so special, but Dave is a one off – namely because our music comes from jamming in the studio. His piano playing and musicality are phenomenal, as well as the diverse influences we both draw from, so it’s a great blend. [...] Dave typically creates ideas on the piano, and I’ll sometimes sit down the other end of the keyboard, adding bass notes or chords, or will grab a guitar or bass or be playing on the Akai MPC4000 or Ableton." Expanding on the Baroque influences on the album, Smith said, "We knew from the beginning that we’d be drawing from a very wide musical palette of strings, brass, harps, and hard-hitting drums and synths. I love to blend acoustic instrumentation with electronic elements. Manon Grandjean, my long-standing engineer, beautifully captured Dave’s piano, guitars, drums and vocals at my studio in Fulham." Regarding the album's vocals, a Sony C800 microphone was used and tracked through a UTA mic pre, summit TLA 100 compressor and then the UTA Unfairchild compressor.

Themes 
Psychodrama has been referred to as a "concept album", and has a three-act structure; act one is defined as "environment", act two "relationships", and act three "social compass". Smith said that Dave "spent a long time coming up with the title and concept for the album [...] Psychodrama was always going to be a very ambitious project. [...] The overarching theme was to document Dave’s life up to this point in terms of his upbringing, his life in South London as a young black male, the struggles, the joys, the uncertainty, the ambitions, hopes and fears. The album addresses a number of issues, particularly focusing on Dave's struggles with mental health, namely depression. The first track begins with Dave talking to a therapist, a constant throughout the album.

Other themes include Dave's strained relationships, poor upbringing, his father's absence and the impact it had on him, and issues such as domestic abuse and racial inequality. Dave has said much of the inspiration for the album came from his older brother, Christopher, who is serving life in prison. The themes of psychotherapy came from the same type of therapy his brother receives in prison.

The 11-minute song "Lesley" details the story of a woman going through an abusive relationship; Dave describes the song as "a story about someone suffering a complete loss of character by being with someone that isn’t good for them."

Critical reception

Psychodrama received universal acclaim from critics. At Metacritic, which assigns a normalised rating out of 100 to reviews from mainstream publications, the album received an average score of 90, based on 10 reviews and it is currently one of the top 100 highest-rated albums on the website. For Complex, Natty Kasambala wrote that "For a record tackling such heavy subject matter, it's still shockingly listenable and by constantly moving through different paces it holds your interest", praising the album's lyrics, production and Dave's flow. Writing on Dave's subject matter versatility Dan-O from Freemusicempire commented "It is exciting to find someone with this much to say on this many subjects while exercising this much versatility but more importantly... this dude has a plan."

Alexis Petridis of The Guardian acclaimed Psychodrama with a perfect score, calling it "the boldest and best British rap album in a generation." Petridis described Dave's lyrics as "smart, thoughtful, unflinching and self-aware", adding that it "says something about how incisive Dave is as a writer that the album lasts for the best part of an hour, and not a minute of its running time seems wasted or padded out." The Independent labelled Psychodrama as "one of the most thoughtful, moving and necessary albums of 2019 so far", complimenting the concept and lyrical content: "Tracks are at once astute and deeply personal in how they capture vignettes of everyday life and spin them into important lessons."

Dan-O of Freemusicempire wrote "He opens the album in a therapist[']s office getting personal right off the bat and giving you a setting that makes sense so you don't feel awkward. He's meticulous and diligent…maybe that's not the right word. He's so in love with finding the depth in art, the kind of depth that resonates, that working harder to achieve it doesn't bother him in the slightest."

Sam Higgins of The Line of Best Fit lauded Psychodrama as "a record that's suffocatingly intense", concluding: "Psychodrama isn't an album to stand up and rejoice to. It's a sit-down-and-consume, a listen-and-learn. In doing that, you appreciate the blood, sweat and tears that have gone into the prose. It’s an overwhelmingly powerful 51 minutes of music unlike anything released this year. We're truly in the presence of someone leading a remarkable generation of UK rap and I have no doubt we'll look back at Psychodrama as a seminal piece of art in this movement." Carl Anka of NME also awarded the album a perfect score, calling it a "masterpiece", "bold and thought-provoking", and "the kind of record that comes along only rarely."

Reviewing the album for AllMusic, David Crone stated that the album "has all the makings of a generational classic. Packing dense lyricism, poignant introspection, and resonant production into a neatly compiled concept, Dave's debut album is the product of a MC beyond his years, standing firmly among the Godfathers and Made in the Manors as one of the strongest British rap albums of the decade.

Accolades

Commercial performance
Predicted to chart at number five midweek, Psychodrama debuted at number one on the UK Albums Chart, selling a combined 26,390 album-equivalent units. The album became the most-streamed first-week British rap album in the UK with a total of 23.6 million streams. It is also the first British rap album to chart at number one since Gang Signs & Prayer by Stormzy, released in 2017. Psychodrama also debuted at number 26 on the Dutch Album Top 100, number 6 on the Irish Albums Chart and number 19 on the Scottish Albums Chart.

Following the release of Psychodrama, Dave landed the three highest charting new entries on the UK Singles Chart for the week of March 15, with album tracks "Disaster", "Streatham" and "Location", debuting at numbers 8, 9 and 11, respectively. "Location" reached a peak of number 6 after being released as a single.

Track listing

Notes
  signifies an additional producer
 "Purple Heart" contains a sample of the recording "Supastar", performed by Floetry.

Personnel

Musicians
 David "Dave" Omoregie – primary artist , executive production, production , additional production , piano , keyboards 
 Fraser T. Smith – executive production, production , additional production , piano , keyboards , additional keyboards , acoustic guitar , bass programming , drum programming , bass guitar 
 Burna Boy – featured artist 
 J Hus – featured artist 
 Ruelle – featured artist 
 169 – production , piano 
 1Mind – production , music production 
 Jae5 – production 
 Kyle Evans – production , piano 
 TSB – music production 
 Nana Rogues – production 
 Barry Clements – trombone 
 Beverley Jones – double bass 
 Bryony James – cello 
 Camilla Pay – harp 
 Chloe Vincent – flute 
 Corinne Bailey – french horn 
 Edward Tarrant – trombone 
 Ellie Stanford – violin 
 Emma Owens – viola 
 Gillian Cameron – violin 
 Hayley Pomfrett – violin 
 Helen Hathorn – violin 
 James Douglas – cello 
 Jenny Sacha – violin 
 Meghan Cassidy – viola 
 Patrick Kiernan – violin 
 Richard Pryce – double bass 
 Rosie Danvers – cello 
 Ruth O'Reilly – french horn 
 Sally Jackson – violin 
 Wired Strings – strings 
 Zara Benyounes – violin 
 Selam Woldehaimanot - co-writer/un-featured artist (track 7)

Technical
 169 – drum programming 
 Dan Hayden – assistant recording engineer 
 Jae5 – vocal engineer 
 Manon Grandjean – engineering, mixing, mastering 
 Michael Zuvela – vocal engineering 
 Nana Rogues – vocal engineering 
 Nick Taylor – engineer 
 Olly Thompson – assistant recording engineering 
 Paul Carr – assistant recording engineer 
 Paul Pritchard – engineering 
 Phillip Davidson – vocal engineering 
 Rosie Danvers – string arranger 
 Trevor Anderson – vocal engineer

Charts

Weekly charts

Year-end charts

Certifications

References

2019 debut albums
Dave (rapper) albums
Albums produced by Dave (rapper)
Albums produced by Fraser T. Smith
Brit Award for British Album of the Year
Concept albums
Mercury Prize-winning albums